Adult puppeteering is the use of puppets in contexts aimed at adult audiences. Serious theatrical pieces can use puppets, either for aesthetic reasons, or to achieve special effects that would otherwise be impossible with human actors. In parts of the world where puppet shows have traditionally been children's entertainment, many find the notion of puppets in decidedly adult situations—for example, involving drugs, sex, profanity, or violence—to be humorous, because of the bizarre contrast it creates between subject matter and characters.

Adult puppeteering appears in many forms. In the US and UK it is more easily found on screen.  Television satire such as the UK's Spitting Image provides a strong link to the earlier traditions of Punch and Judy or Commedia dell'Arte as sources of social and political commentary. Puppetry sitcoms such as the US series Dinosaurs feature puppet characters who are entertaining in themselves, not as satirical figures.  Adult puppet theatre has a strong tradition in Asia and parts of Europe, and has a smaller presence in Australia, the UK and the US. Handspan Theatre from Melbourne, Australia, toured internationally with its innovative and often surreal adult productions.

Puppeteers and companies that perform for adult audiences
 Richard Bradshaw
 The Bread & Puppet Theater
 Ronnie Burkett
 Nina Conti
 Jeff Dunham
 Ed the Sock
 Jim Henson
 In the Heart of the Beast Puppet and Mask Theater
 Sergey Obraztsov
 Otto Petersen
 Paul Zaloom
 Nikolai Zykov
 Randy Feltface
 Thalias Kompagnons

Television programmes
Sam and Friends (1955–61) - WRC-TV
The Muppet Show (1976-1981) - ITV (UK), Syndication (US)
Spitting Image (1984–96, 2020) - ITV (1984–96), Britbox (2020)
 Rubbery Figures (1984–90) - ABC Australia, Seven Network
 D.C. Follies (1987–89)
 Les Guignols de l'Info (1988–2018) - Canal+ France
 Mystery Science Theater 3000 (1988–99, 2017)- KTMA-TV, Comedy Central, Syfy, Netflix
The Jim Henson Hour (1989) - NBC
Dinosaurs (1991–94) - ABC
Muppets Tonight (1996-1998) - ABC (1996), Disney Channel (1997-1998)
Aliens in the Family (1996) - ABC
Lost on Earth (1997) - USA Network
Triumph the Insult Comic Dog (1997) on Late Night with Conan O'Brien - NBC
Sifl and Olly (1997–99) - MTV
A Scare at Bedtime (1997–2005) - RTÉ
The Man Show (1999) episodes - puppet porn - Comedy Central
Farscape (1999–2002) - Sci-Fi Channel
TV Funhouse spin-off series (2000–01) - Comedy Central
Greg the Bunny (2000–02, 2005) - Manhattan Neighborhood Network, IFC, Fox
 Internet Slutts - Wally & Murk (2000–01) - The Comedy Network
 Puppets Who Kill (2002–06) - The Comedy Network
 Crank Yankers (2002–07) - Comedy Central, MTV2
 Chappelle's Show (2003) episode - STD puppets
 The Bronx Bunny Show (2003/07) - Channel 4, Starz!
 "Smile Time", an episode of Angel (2004) - The WB
 Wonder Showzen (2005) - MTV
 Live Hot Puppet Chat (2005) - SRTV
 Las noticias del guiñol - Canal+ Spain
 Le Bébête Show (1983–95) - TF1 France
 Polskie Zoo (1991–93) - TVP 1 Poland
 Куклы (1994-2002) - NTV Russia
 Ed's Night Party (1995-2010) - Citytv Canada
 Fur TV (2008) - MTV
 The Podge and Rodge Show (2006–09)- RTÉ
 Mongrels (2010) - BBC Three - UK
 Warren the Ape (2010) - MTV
 Apollo's Pad (2011) 
Don't Hug Me I'm Scared (2011-) - YouTube, Channel 4 
The Muppets (2015-2016) - ABC 
Newzoids (2015–16) - ITV
 The Gorburger Show (2017) - Comedy Central
 The Dark Crystal: Age of Resistance (2019) - Netflix

Films
 Let My Puppets Come (1976) US
 The Dark Crystal (1982) US
 Gremlins (1984) US
 The Pied Piper (1985) Czechoslovakia
 Ghoulies (1985) US
 Short Circuit (1986) US
 Labyrinth (1986) US
 Short Circuit 2 (1988) US
 Meet the Feebles (1989) NZ
 Puppet Master (1989) US
 Gremlins 2: The New Batch (1990) US
 Mystery Science Theater 3000: The Movie (1996) US
 Being John Malkovich (1999) US
 Little Nicky (2000) US
 Team America: World Police (2004) US
 Strings (2004) Denmark/Sweden/Norway/UK
 Live Freaky! Die Freaky! (2004) US
 Dante's Inferno (2007) US
 The Fuzz (2014)
 The Happytime Murders (2018)
 Frank & Zed (2020)
 Abruptio (2023)
 We R Animals (TBA)

Live performance
 Les Poupées de Paris (1957) by the Kroffts
 Puppetry of the Penis (1997–2005) Australia
 Cabaret of Metamorphoses (2000–present) of Nikolai Zykov
 Avenue Q (2003–Present)
 Otto & George (ventriloquist and dummy)
 Jim Henson's Puppet Up Uncensored (2006–present)
 Tommy Murphy's Holding the Man, a play aimed at an adult audience features some puppetry
 New Animation (2012–present) of Nikolai Zykov

See also
 Puppeteering
 Adult animation
 List of stop-motion films
 Kenya Institute of Puppet Theatre (KIPT)

External links
List of adult-oriented Czechoslovakian puppet films

Puppetry